Laurieston may refer to the following places in Scotland:

 Laurieston, Dumfries and Galloway, see List of United Kingdom locations: La-Laz#Lap–Laz
 Laurieston, Falkirk
 Laurieston, Glasgow

See also
 Lauriston (disambiguation)